Henry James Forman (February 17, 1879 – January 3, 1966) was an author famous for his 1933 book Our Movie Made Children, which was a summary of the Payne Fund Studies. The book has been described as an "alarmist tome", and was responsible for publicizing the study's more negative results.

References

Sources
Doherty, Thomas Patrick. Pre-Code Hollywood: Sex, Immorality, and Insurrection in American Cinema 1930-1934. New York: Columbia University Press, 1999. 
Jowett, Garth S., Ian C. Jarvie, and Kathryn H. Fuller. Children and the movies: media influence and the Payne Fund controversy. Cambridge University Press, 1996. 
Massey, Anne. Hollywood Beyond the Screen: Design and Material Culture. Berg Publishers, 2000.

External links
 

Henry James Forman Papers, 1917–1957

1879 births
1966 deaths
20th-century male writers
American non-fiction writers
Place of birth missing
Place of death missing